Yekaterinovka may refer to:
Yekaterinovka, Azerbaijan, a village in Khachmaz Rayon of Azerbaijan
Yekaterinovka, Russia, name of several inhabited localities in Russia